Julius Carl Raschdorff (2 July 1823 – 13 August 1914) was a German architect and academic teacher. He is considered one of the notable architects of the second half of the 19th century in Germany and created his most important work with the Berlin Cathedral.

Life 
Born in Pleß, after his Abitur in 1842 in Gliwice, Raschdorff studied at the Berlin Bauakademie from 1845 to 1853. From his appointment as 2nd city architect on 1 November 1854, he worked in Cologne until 1878. From 1864, he was 1st city architect, but left office in 1872 to settle as a private architect. In 1856, Raschdorff gave a lecture on new building techniques at the Paris World Exhibition. Raschdorff became professor of architecture at the Technical University of Berlin in 1878. In 1914, he became emeritus. Raschdorff designed over 220 buildings in Germany and neighbouring countries, of which about 100 were executed in 40 different locations. In 1896, he received a large gold medal at the Große Berliner Kunstausstellung.

His son Otto also became an architect and his closest collaborator.

Work

Buildings and designs 

 1858–1860:  in Rolandseck
 1861: Wallraf-Richartz-Museum (together with Felten)
 1865–1866: Haus der Casino-Gesellschaft in Saarbrücken (today Landtag of Saarland)
 1859–1860:  in Cologne
 1869–1872: Municipal theatre in Cologne, Glockengasse (destroyed in the Second World War)
 1870–1872: Etzweiler manor house and estate in Elsdorf (Bergheim/Erft district) (listed, but demolished after 2006 for Hambach open-cast mine))
 1871:  of the railway stations in Kyllburg and in 
 1871–1874: Villa for Gottfried Conze in Langenberg (Rhineland), Hauptstraße 103
 1872–1875: Deaconess House "Sarepta" in Bethel (Bielefeld)
 1876–1880: Estates House in Düsseldorf
 1877: New Protestant Church in Langenberg (Rheinland), Donnerstraße 15 (today "Event-Kirche")
 1877: Rectory in Langenberg (Rheinland), Wiemerstraße 12
 1877–1878: Villa for Hermann Colsman in Langenberg (Rheinland), Wiemerstraße 8
 1877:  for the textile manufacturer David Peters in Velbert
 1878–1880: Post Office building (Post Office, Telegraph Office and Oberpostdirektion Münster), Domplatz 6/7
 1878: Amtsgericht in Langenberg (Rheinland), Hauptstraße 122
 1878: Design of a villa for Andreas Colsman in Langenberg (Rhineland) (The execution took place in 1884 in a modified form according to plans by Hermann Otto Pflaume.)
 1878–1884: Neubau der Technischen Hochschule in (Berlin-)Charlottenburg (together with Richard Lucae and Friedrich Hitzig)
 1879: Tower of the German Church, Stockholm
 1880: 
 1884–1885: St. George's Anglican Church, Berlin in the garden of Schloss Monbijou in Berlin
 1888–1889:  in Krásná Lípa (Nordböhmen)
 1890: Reception building of the central station in Münster (Westfalen)
 1890: Kaiser Friedrich Mausoleum
 1894–1905: Berlin Cathedral
 1895–1897: Grabkapelle of the Counts Henckel von Donnersmarck at Neudeck Castle in Upper Silesia
In total, six churches, one synagogue, 17 school buildings, four university buildings, two museums, two libraries, four hospitals, one theatre, two town halls, seven railway stations, seven castles or palaces, 23 villas and ten residential and commercial buildings by Raschdorff are known to date.

Drafts 
In 1884, his competition design for the Museum Island development was awarded 4th prize alongside his son Otto Raschdorff (1854–1915).

Publications 
 Das Kaufhaus Gürzenich in Köln. Berlin 1863.
 Abbildungen deutscher Schmiedewerke. Berlin 1875–78 (short edition 1878).
 Entwürfe und Bauausführungen im Stil deutscher Renaissance. Berlin 1879.
 Die Hochbau-Ausfuehrungen des preußischen Staates. Toeche, Berlin 1880. (DTAW|raschdorff_hochbau_1880)
 Abbildung deutscher Schmiedewerke. Verlag von Ernst & Korn, Berlin 1882.
 Palastarchitektur von Oberitalien und Toskana. Berlin 1883–88 (2nd part: Toskana, 3rd part: Venedig; als Fortsetzung des von Robert von Reinhardt begonnenen Werks).
 Ein Entwurf Kaiser Friedrichs zum Neubau des Doms und zur Vollendung des königlichen Schlosses in Berlin. Berlin 1888.
 Baukunst der Renaissance. 4 volumes, Berlin 1880–90.
 Rheinische Holz- und Fachwerksbauten des 16. und 17. Jahrhunderts. Berlin 1895.

References

Further reading 
 
 Klaus Peters: Leben und Werk des Architekten Julius Carl Raschdorff. (1823–1914). Universität Hannover – Institut für Geschichte und Theorie im FB Architektur, Hannover 2004, . (Schriften des Institutes für Bau- und Kunstgeschichte der Universität Hannover, vol. 14.)
 Uwe Kieling: Berlin. Bauten und Baumeister. Von der Gotik bis 1945. Berlin-Edition, Berlin 2003, .
 Julius Carl Raschdorff: Aufzeichnungen aus dem Leben und Schaffen des Architekten Professor J. C. Raschdorff. Vaterländische Verlagsanstalt, Berlin 1903.

External links 

 

Historicist architects
19th-century German architects
Academic staff of the Technical University of Berlin
1823 births
1914 deaths
People from Pszczyna